Eudendrium eximium is a marine species of cnidaria, a hydroid (Hydrozoa) in the family Eudendriidae.

References

Eudendrium
Animals described in 1877